Grand-Saint-Esprit is a municipality in the Centre-du-Québec region of the province of Quebec in Canada. The population as of the Canada 2011 Census was 471.

Demographics

Population
Population trend:

Language
Mother tongue language (2006)

See also
List of municipalities in Quebec

References 

Municipalities in Quebec
Incorporated places in Centre-du-Québec
Nicolet-Yamaska Regional County Municipality